Morotai Island Regency is a regency of North Maluku province, Indonesia, located on Morotai Island. It covers an area of 2,337.15 km2. The population was 52,860 at the 2010 census and 74,436 at the 2020 census.

History
During the fifteenth and sixteenth centuries, Morotai was generally within the sphere of influence of the powerful sultanate on the island of Ternate. It was the core of a larger region, called Moro, that included the island and the coastline of Halmahera closest to Morotai to the south.

In the mid-sixteenth century, the island was also the site of a Portuguese Jesuit mission. The Muslim states on Ternate and Halmahera resented the outpost for its proselytising activities, and managed to drive the mission from the island in 1571, as a part of a larger Portuguese retreat in the region. In the seventeenth century, Ternate further exerted its power over Morotai by repeatedly forcing major parts of the population to move off the island. Early in the century most of the population was moved to Dodinga, a small town in a strategic spot on Halmahera's west coast. Later, in 1627 and 1628, Sultan Hamzah of Ternate had much of the Christian population of the island moved to Malayu, on Ternate, where they could be more easily controlled.

World War II

The island was captured by the Japanese in early 1942. Morotai's southern plain was taken by American forces in September 1944 during the Battle of Morotai, and used as a staging point for the Allied invasion of the Philippines in early 1945, and of Borneo in May and June of that year. Japanese soldier Teruo Nakamura was discovered in the Morotai jungle in 1974, as one of the World War II Japanese soldiers who held out subsequent to the Japanese military's surrender.

Post-independence
Morotai became its own regency in 2008, separating from the North Halmahera Regency.

Geography
Morotai is a rugged, forested island lying to the north of Halmahera. The regency's largest town is Daruba, on the island's south coast. Almost all of Morotai's numerous villages are coastal settlements; a paved road linking those on the east coast starts from Daruba and will eventually reach Bere-Bere, the principal town on Morotai's east coast,  from Daruba.

Administration 
At the 2010 census, the regency was divided into five districts (kecamatan), but a sixth district has recently been added by cutting off Rao Island from Morotai Selatan Barat District. The districts are tabulated below with their areas and their populations at the 2010 census and 2020 census. The table also includes the locations of the district administrative centres, and the number of villages (rural desa and urban kelurahan) in each district.

{| class="sortable wikitable"
|-
! Name  || English name || Area in  km2 || Populationcensus 2010|| Populationcensus 2020 || Admin  centre || No. of villages
|-
| Morotai Selatan || South Morotai ||align="right"|379.25||align="right"|17,547||align="right"|28,579||Daruba||align="center"| 25
|-
| Morotai Timur || East Morotai ||align="right"|342.25||align="right"|7,779||align="right"|10,846||Sangowa||align="center"| 15
|-
| Morotai Selatan Barat || Southwest Morotai ||align="right"|557.12||align="right"|11,078||align="right"|13,863||Wayabula||align="center"| 15
|-
| Morotai Utara || North Morotai ||align="right"| 478.31||align="right"|9,226||align="right"|9,588||Bere-Bere||align="center"| 14
|-
| Morotai Jaya || Great Morotai ||align="right"| 519.85||align="right"|7,067||align="right"|11,560||Sopi||align="center"| 14
|-
| Pulau Rao || Rai Island ||align="right"| 60.06||align="right"|(a)||align="right"|(a)||Leo-Leo||align="center"| 5
|-
| Totals || ||align="right"| 2,337.15||align="right"| 52,860||align="right"| 74,436|| Daruba||align="center"| 88|}

Note: (a) the populations in 2010 and 2020 of Rao Island are included in the figures for Morotai Selatan Barat District, from which it was cut out.

Economy
The island is heavily wooded and produces timber and resin and has a subsistence fishing industry. In October 2010, the Indonesia government requested assistance of the Republic of China (Taiwan) to help exploiting this island.
In 2011 the company PT Halmahera Development & Investment was looking to invest in eco-tourism on the island of Morotai; also small projects to help the people and children of morotai are being planned or unfold like "Help Morotai" a small non-profit origination that is focused on helping children of the Island.https://www.facebook.com/pages/Help-Morotai-Indonesia/129940680454616.  

Energy
Currently 3MW Diesel generators across 3 locations one with 2MW, and 2 at 0.5MW. The electrification ratio is reported as 80%. Eight potential locations for micro-hydro were identified by ESDM/KKP.

Morotai Aerodrome
The provincial government make an effort to turn Pitu Airport into an international aerodrome to boost tourists. 'Pitu' means seven due to they have seven lanes of take off and landing built in World War II. It has now been renamed Leo Wattimena Airport as a commercial airport.

References
Andaya, Leonard (1993). The world of Maluku: eastern Indonesia in the early modern period. Honolulu: University of Hawaii Press.
Villiers, John (1988). Las Yslas de Esperar en Dios: The Jesuit Mission in Moro 1546–1571. Modern Asian Studies'' 22(3):593-606.

Regencies of North Maluku